Thomsonfly was a British charter and scheduled airline. Thomsonfly was the first stage of TUI AG's plans to expand its business within TUI UK prior to September 2007.  After TUI UK merged with First Choice Holidays in September 2007, it became part of TUI Travel PLC.  The new holiday company continued with both in-house airlines (Thomsonfly and First Choice Airways) through Winter 2007 and Summer 2008 until the two were merged on 1 November 2008 as Thomson Airways.

Thomsonfly Limited held a United Kingdom Civil Aviation Authority Type A Operating Licence permitting it to carry passengers, cargo and mail on aircraft with 20 or more seats.

History 
As part of a wider reorganisation of TUI's UK operations in September 2004, it was announced that Britannia would be rebranded as Thomsonfly. Thomsonfly Limited changed its name to Thomson Airways in October 2008.

Destinations

Fleet 
In October 2008, the Thomsonfly fleet comprised:

Statistics
{|
|-
|

See also
 List of defunct airlines of the United Kingdom

References

External links

 Thomson Flights – Official website
 TUI Travel PLC – Official website
 TUI Group – Official website
 Thomsonfly (Archive)
 Fleet

Defunct airlines of the United Kingdom
Defunct European low-cost airlines
Airlines established in 2005
Airlines disestablished in 2008